Mohamed Omar El-Zeer (Arabic: محمد عمر الزير‎ ; born 3 September 1958) is an Egyptian retired professional footballer who played as an defender. He competed in the men's tournament at the 1984 Summer Olympics.

Career statistics

International

Honours

Egypt
African Cup of Nations: 1986
Africa Games: 1987

References

External links
 

1958 births
Living people
Egyptian footballers
Egypt international footballers
Olympic footballers of Egypt
Footballers at the 1984 Summer Olympics
Association football defenders
Mediterranean Games bronze medalists for Egypt
Mediterranean Games medalists in football
Competitors at the 1983 Mediterranean Games